Copălău is a commune in Botoșani County, Western Moldavia, Romania. It is composed of three villages: Cerbu, Copălău, and Cotu. It included four other villages until 2003, when these were detached to form Coșula commune.

Geography
The commune is situated on the Moldavian Plain, on the banks of the river Miletin. It is located in the southern part of the county,  from the county seat, Botoșani. To the north, Copălău borders Sulița commune, to the south and east the town of Flămânzi, and to the west and northwest Coșula and Bălușeni communes.

Copălău garlic
It is said that the garlic of Copălău is the best in Romania. Considered unique due to the soil's quality, the Copălău garlic has gained fame both nationally and internationally; as a result, authorities are preparing to register it as a product with a protected geographical indication.

Natives
Adriana Bazon (b. 1963), rower
Florica Lavric (1962–2014), rower

References

Communes in Botoșani County
Localities in Western Moldavia